This is a list of the National Register of Historic Places listings in Washakie County, Wyoming.  It is intended to be a complete list of the properties and districts on the National Register of Historic Places in Washakie County, Wyoming, United States.  The locations of National Register properties and districts for which the latitude and longitude coordinates are included below, may be seen in a map.

There are 7 properties and districts listed on the National Register in the county.

Listings county-wide 

|}

See also 

 List of National Historic Landmarks in Wyoming
 National Register of Historic Places listings in Wyoming

References 

Washakie